The moths of the Seychelles represent about 275 known species. The moths (mostly nocturnal) and butterflies (mostly diurnal) together make up the taxonomic order Lepidoptera.

This is a list of moth species which have been recorded on the Seychelles, a 115-island country in the Indian Ocean.

Alucitidae
Alucita melanodactyla Legrand, 1966
Alucita seychellensis (T. B. Fletcher, 1910)

Arctiidae
Amerila aldabrensis (Freyer, 1912)
Argina astrea (Drury, 1773)
Eilema aldabrensis (Hampson, 1914)
Eilema contorta Fryer, 1912
Eilema lamprocraspis (Hampson, 1914)
Euchromia folletii (Guérin-Méneville, 1832)
Exilisia subfusca (Freyer, 1912)
Mahensia seychellarum Fryer, 1912
Nyctemera seychellensis (Hampson, 1908)
Utetheisa lactea (Butler, 1884)
Utetheisa lotrix (Cramer, 1779)
Utetheisa pulchella (Linnaeus, 1758)
Utetheisa pulchelloides Hampson, 1907

Carposinidae
Meridarchis caementaria Meyrick, 1911

Choreutidae
Choreutis gratiosa (Meyrick, 1911)

Coleophoridae
Blastobasis tabernatella (Legrand, 1966)

Copromorphidae
Copromorpha cryptochlora Meyrick, 1930

Cosmopterigidae
Bifascioides sindonia (Meyrick, 1911)

Crambidae
Aethaloessa calidalis (Guenée, 1854)
Alytana aldabralis (Viette, 1958)
Autocharis amethystina Swinhoe, 1894
Autocharis barbieri (Legrand, 1966)
Bocchoris inspersalis (Zeller, 1852)
Cadarena pudoraria (Hübner, 1825)
Chabulina putrisalis (Viette, 1958)
Chrysocatharylla agraphellus (Hampson, 1919)
Cirrhochrista mulleralis Legrand, 1957
Cirrhochrista perbrunnealis T. B. Fletcher, 1910
Cnaphalocrocis trapezalis (Guenée, 1854)
Cnaphalocrocis trebiusalis (Walker, 1859)
Condylorrhiza zyphalis (Viette, 1958)
Conocramboides seychellellus (T. B. Fletcher, 1910)
Crocidolomia pavonana (Fabricius, 1794)
Diaphana indica (Saunders, 1851)
Duponchelia fovealis Zeller, 1847
Eurrhyparodes tricoloralis (Zeller, 1852)
Glyphodes capensis (Walker, 1866)
Glyphodes duponti de Joannis, 1915
Haritalodes derogata (Fabricius, 1775)
Hellula undalis (Fabricius, 1781)
Herpetogramma licarsisalis (Walker, 1859)
Hymenoptychis sordida Zeller, 1852
Lamprosema aldabralis (Viette, 1958)
Maruca vitrata (Fabricius, 1787)
Microcrambon paphiellus (Guenée, 1862)
Nomophila noctuella ([Denis & Schiffermüller], 1775)
Noorda blitealis Walker, 1859
Notarcha quaternalis (Zeller, 1852)
Omiodes dnopheralis (Mabille, 1900)
Omiodes indicata (Fabricius, 1775)
Orphanostigma abruptalis (Walker, 1859)
Palpita vitrealis (Rossi, 1794)
Pessocosma prolalis (Viette & Legrand, 1958)
Psara minoralis (Warren, 1892)
Sameodes cancellalis (Zeller, 1852)
Stemorrhages sericea (Drury, 1773)
Stenochora lancinalis (Guenée, 1854)
Udea ferrugalis (Hübner, 1796)
Zebronia mahensis (T. B. Fletcher, 1910)

Elachistidae
Ethmia nigroapicella (Saalmüller, 1880)

Gelechiidae
Dichomeris acuminata (Staudinger, 1876)

Geometridae
Casuariclystis latifascia (Walker, 1866)
Chloroclystis gerberae Herbulot, 1964
Chloroclystis mokensis Prout L. B., 1937
Chloroclystis oceanica Herbulot, 1962
Colocleora acharis Herbulot, 1962
Comostola laesaria (Walker, 1861)
Comostolopsis simplex Warren, 1902
Comostolopsis sladeni Prout, 1915
Comostolopsis stillata (Felder & Rogenhofer, 1875)
Episteira mouliniei Legrand, 1971
Erastria leucicolor (Butler, 1875)
Erastria madecassaria (Boisduval, 1833)
Eucrostes disparata Walker, 1861
Gymnoscelis tenera Warren, 1901
Idaea poecilocrossa (Prout L.B., 1932)
Idaea pulveraria (Snellen, 1872)
Isturgia deerraria (Walker, 1861)
Ozola inexcisata Fryer, 1912
Phaiogramma stibolepida (Butler, 1879)
Problepsis deducta Herbulot, 1962
Scardamia maculata Warren, 1897
Scopula aspiciens Prout, 1926
Scopula legrandi Herbulot, 1962
Scopula minorata (Boisduval, 1833)
Scopula serena Prout, 1920
Scopula sparsipunctata (Mabille, 1900)
Thalassodes antithetica Herbulot, 1964
Thalassodes quadraria Guenée, 1857
Xenimpia trizonata (Saalmüller, 1891)

Glyphipterigidae
Glyphipterix dichalina Meyrick, 1911
Glyphipterix medica Meyrick, 1911

Gracillariidae
Acrocercops angelica Meyrick, 1919
Acrocercops largoplaga Legrand, 1966
Acrocercops martaella Legrand, 1966
Acrocercops rhombocosma Meyrick, 1911
Caloptilia megalaurata Legrand, 1966
Caloptilia pentaplaca (Meyrick, 1911)
Caloptilia prosticta (Meyrick, 1909)
Caloptilia tirantella Legrand, 1966
Cryptolectica euryphanta (Meyrick, 1911)
Cuphodes tridora Meyrick, 1911
Macarostola parolca Meyrick, 1911

Immidae
Imma francenella Legrand, 1966
Imma quaestoria Meyrick, 1911

Lymantriidae
Euproctis pectinata (Freyer, 1912)

Nepticulidae
Stigmella tropicatella Legrand, 1966

Noctuidae
Achaea catella Guenée, 1852
Achaea mercatoria (Fabricius, 1775)
Achaea violaceofascia (Saalmüller, 1891)
Acontia malgassica Mabille, 1881
Acontia rachiastis (Hampson, 1908)
Acontia transfigurata Wallengren, 1856
Amyna axis Guenée, 1852
Anomis flava (Fabricius, 1775)
Anticarsia rubricans (Boisduval, 1833)
Argyrogramma signata (Fabricius, 1775)
Arsina silenalis Guenée, 1862
Autoba costimacula (Saalmüller, 1880)
Brevipecten malagasy Viette, 1965
Callopistria maillardi (Guenée, 1862)
Callopistria yerburii Butler, 1884
Chalciope delta (Boisduval, 1833)
Chasmina tibialis (Fabricius, 1775)
Chrysodeixis chalcites (Esper, 1789)
Condica conducta (Walker, 1857)
Condica pauperata (Walker, 1858)
Ctenoplusia limbirena (Guenée, 1852)
Cyligramma latona (Cramer, 1775)
Dysgonia angularis (Boisduval, 1833)
Dysgonia torrida (Guenée, 1852)
Erebus walkeri (Butler, 1875)
Eublemma ragusana (Freyer, 1844)
Eublemma rivula (Moore, 1882)
Eublemmoides apicimacula (Mabille, 1880)
Eutelia discitriga Walker, 1865
Eutelia geyeri (Felder & Rogenhofer, 1874)
Gesonia obeditalis Walker, 1859
Gracilodes nysa Guenée, 1852
Grammodes bifasciata (Petagna, 1787)
Grammodes geometrica (Fabricius, 1775)
Grammodes stolida (Fabricius, 1775)
Helicoverpa armigera (Hübner, [1808])
Hypena conscitalis Walker, 1866
Hypena obacerralis Walker, [1859]
Hypena varialis Walker, 1866
Mocis conveniens (Walker, 1858)
Mocis frugalis (Fabricius, 1775)
Mocis mayeri (Boisduval, 1833)
Mocis proverai Zilli, 2000
Polydesma umbricola Boisduval, 1833
Progonia matilei Orhant, 2001
Progonia oileusalis (Walker, 1859)
Rhesala moestalis (Walker, 1866)
Rivula dimorpha Fryer, 1912
Simplicia extinctalis (Zeller, 1852)
Spodoptera cilium Guenée, 1852
Spodoptera littoralis (Boisduval, 1833)
Spodoptera mauritia (Boisduval, 1833)
Stictoptera antemarginata Saalmüller, 1880
Trigonodes exportata Guenée, 1852
Trigonodes hyppasia (Cramer, 1779)

Nolidae
Bryophilopsis nesta T. B. Fletcher, 1910
Earias biplaga Walker, 1866
Leocyma discophora Hampson, 1912
Nycteola mauritia (de Joannis, 1906)

Notodontidae
Iridoplitis malgassica Kiriakoff, 1960

Oecophoridae
Calicotis animula Meyrick, 1911
Metachanda trixantha (Meyrick, 1911)
Pachyrhabda tridora Meyrick, 1911
Platactis hormathota Meyrick, 1911
Stathmopoda auriferella (Walker, 1864)
Stathmopoda biclavis Meyrick, 1911
Stathmopoda daubanella (Legrand, 1958)
Stathmopoda epilampra Meyrick, 1911
Stathmopoda luxuriosa Meyrick, 1911
Stathmopoda superdaubanella (Legrand, 1958)

Psychidae
Melasina tabernalis Meyrick, 1911

Pterophoridae
Hellinsia aldabrensis (T. B. Fletcher, 1910)
Hepalastis pumilio (Zeller, 1873)
Lantanophaga pusillidactylus (Walker, 1864)
Megalorhipida leptomeres (Meyrick, 1886)
Megalorhipida leucodactylus (Fabricius, 1794)
Platyptilia claripicta T. B. Fletcher, 1910
Platyptilia dimorpha T. B. Fletcher, 1910
Sphenarches anisodactylus (Walker, 1864)
Sphenarches caffer (Zeller, 1851)
Stenodacma wahlbergi (Zeller, 1852)
Stenoptilodes taprobanes (Felder & Rogenhofer, 1875)

Pyralidae
Ematheudes nigropunctata (Legrand, 1966)
Endotricha decessalis Walker, 1859
Endotricha mesenterialis (Walker, 1859)
Endotricha vinolentalis Ragonot, 1891
Etiella zinckenella (Treitschke, 1832)
Hypsopygia mauritialis (Boisduval, 1833)
Lepipaschia inornata Shaffer & Solis, 1994

Sphingidae
Acherontia atropos (Linnaeus, 1758)
Agrius convolvuli (Linnaeus, 1758)
Cephonodes tamsi Griveaud, 1960
Daphnis nerii (Linnaeus, 1758)
Hippotion celerio (Linnaeus, 1758)
Hippotion eson (Cramer, 1779)
Hippotion isis Rothschild & Jordan, 1903
Hippotion osiris (Dalman, 1823)
Macroglossum alluaudi de Joannis, 1893
Nephele leighi Joycey & Talbot, 1921
Temnora fumosa (Walker, 1856)
Temnora peckoveri (Butler, 1876)

Thyrididae
Banisia aldabrana (Fryer, 1912)
Banisia apicale (Freyer, 1912)
Banisia tibiale (Fryer, 1912)
Hapana carcealis Whalley, 1971

Tineidae
Afrocelestis lochaea (Meyrick, 1911)
Amphixystis beverrasella (Legrand, 1966)
Amphixystis crobylora (Meyrick, 1911)
Amphixystis cyanodesma (Meyrick, 1911)
Amphixystis ensifera (Meyrick, 1911)
Amphixystis fricata (Meyrick, 1911)
Amphixystis glomerata (Meyrick, 1911)
Amphixystis hermatias (Meyrick, 1911)
Amphixystis ichnora (Meyrick, 1911)
Amphixystis irenica (Meyrick, 1911)
Amphixystis lactiflua (Meyrick, 1911)
Amphixystis multipunctella (Legrand, 1966)
Amphixystis nephalia (Meyrick, 1911)
Amphixystis polystrigella (Legrand, 1966)
Amphixystis rhodothicta (Meyrick, 1911)
Amphixystis rhothiaula (Meyrick, 1911)
Amphixystis rorida (Meyrick, 1911)
Amphixystis roseostrigella (Legrand, 1966)
Amphixystis selacta (Meyrick, 1911)
Amphixystis sicaria (Meyrick, 1911)
Amphixystis tarsota (Meyrick, 1911)
Archyala pagetodes (Meyrick, 1911)
Crypsithyris concolorella (Walker, 1863)
Erechthias calypta (Meyrick, 1911)
Erechthias eurylyta (Meyrick, 1911)
Erechthias flavistriata (Walsingham, 1907)
Erechthias minuscula (Walsingham, 1897)
Erechthias molynta (Meyrick, 1911)
Erechthias polyplaga (Legrand, 1966)
Erechthias scaligera (Meyrick, 1911)
Erechthias zebrina (Butler, 1881)
Eudarcia saucropis (Meyrick, 1911)
Haplotinea insectella (Fabricius, 1794)
Niditinea fuscella (Linnaeus, 1758)
Opogona autogama (Meyrick, 1911)
Opogona florea (Meyrick, 1911)
Opogona harpalea Meyrick, 1911
Opogona heliogramma (Meyrick, 1911)
Opogona lornatella Legrand, 1966
Opogona phaeochalca Meyrick, 1908
Opogona sacchari (Bojer, 1856)
Opogona sultana Meyrick, 1911
Phereoeca allutella (Rebel, 1892)
Pitharcha chalinaea Meyrick, 1908
Proterodesma tomaea Meyrick, 1911
Scalmatica rimosa Meyrick, 1911
Setomorpha rutella Zeller, 1852
Tinea coronata Meyrick, 1911
Tinea cursoriatella Legrand, 1966
Tinea milichopa Meyrick, 1911
Tiquadra gypsatma (Meyrick, 1911)
Trichophaga mormopis Meyrick, 1935

Tortricidae
Adoxophyes ergatica Meyrick, 1911
Bactra legitima Meyrick, 1911
Brachiolia amblopis (Meyrick, 1911)
Coniostola stereoma (Meyrick, 1912)
Crocidosema plebejana Zeller, 1847
Cryptophlebia caeca Diakonoff, 1969
Cryptophlebia peltastica (Meyrick, 1921)
Cydia malesana (Meyrick, 1920)
Cydia siderocosma (Diakonoff, 1969)
Dudua aprobola (Meyrick, 1886)
Eccopsis incultana (Walker, 1863)
Eccopsis nebulana Walsingham, 1891
Eucosma chlorobathra Meyrick, 1911
Eucosma temenitis Meyrick, 1911
Grapholita limbata Diakonoff, 1969
Grapholita mesoscia Diakonoff, 1969
Grapholita miranda (Meyrick, 1911)
Grapholita rhabdotacra Diakonoff, 1969
Herpystis physalodes (Meyrick, 1910)
Herpystis rusticula Meyrick, 1911
Lobesia vanillana (de Joannis, 1900)
Megaherpystis eusema Diakonoff, 1969
Metriophlebia chaomorpha (Meyrick, 1929)
Neohermenias melanastraptis Diakonoff, 1969
Olethreutes conchopleura (Meyrick, 1911)
Olethreutes hygrantis (Meyrick, 1911)
Phricanthes flexilineana (Walker, 1863)
Selania exornata (Diakonoff, 1969)
Statherotis leucaspis (Meyrick, 1902)
Stenentoma chrysolampra Diakonoff, 1969
Stenentoma onychosema Diakonoff, 1969

Uraniidae
Dirades theclata (Guenée, 1858)

Yponomeutidae
Argyresthia lustralis Meyrick, 1911

References

External links 

M
Seychelles
Seychelles
Seychelles

Moths